Brian Dabul is the defending champion but lost in the second round.
Donald Young won the title, defeating Wayne Odesnik 6–4, 3–6, 6–3 in the finals.

Seeds

Draw

Finals

Top half

Bottom half

References
 Main Draw
 Qualifying Draw

2011 ATP Challenger Tour
2011 Singles